Charles A. Mobley (April 7, 1897 – April 8, 1989) was a Michigan politician.

Political life
The Flint City Commission selected him as mayor for the years 1958-60.  In 1962, he ran for Michigan state representative, 1962 (Genesee County 1st District).  He ran again in 1964 in the 82nd District.

References

Mayors of Flint, Michigan
1897 births
1989 deaths
20th-century American politicians